Christophe Jeannet (born September 22, 1965 in France) is a former professional footballer who played as a goalkeeper.

See also
Football in France
List of football clubs in France

References

External links
Christophe Jeannet profile at chamoisfc79.fr

1965 births
Living people
French footballers
Association football goalkeepers
Racing Besançon players
Chamois Niortais F.C. players
Ligue 2 players
SO Cholet players